Eegje Marjolein Schoo (born 10 June 1944) is a retired Dutch politician and diplomat of the People's Party for Freedom and Democracy (VVD). 

She served as Minister for Development Cooperation from 4 November 1982 until 14 July 1986 in the Cabinet Lubbers I. And a Member of the House of Representatives from 3 June 1986 until 20 January 1987. She served as the Netherlands ambassador to India from 1 June 1987 until 1 January 1991. She was married to fellow politician Arie Pais from 1970 until his death in 2022.

Decorations

References

External links

Official
  Drs. E.M. (Eegje) Schoo Parlement & Politiek

1944 births
Living people
Ambassadors of the Netherlands to India
Commanders of the Order of Orange-Nassau
Dutch corporate directors
Dutch nonprofit directors
Dutch lobbyists
Dutch management consultants
Dutch Jews
20th-century Dutch businesswomen
20th-century Dutch businesspeople
Dutch women ambassadors
Jewish Dutch politicians
Jewish women in business
Jewish women politicians
Knights of the Order of the Netherlands Lion
Members of the House of Representatives (Netherlands)
Members of the Provincial Council of North Holland
Ministers for Development Cooperation of the Netherlands
Politicians from Amsterdam
People's Party for Freedom and Democracy politicians
Dutch Reform Jews
University of Amsterdam alumni
Academic staff of the University of Amsterdam
Women government ministers of the Netherlands
20th-century Dutch civil servants
20th-century Dutch diplomats
Diplomats from Amsterdam
20th-century Dutch women politicians
20th-century Dutch politicians
21st-century Dutch businesswomen
21st-century Dutch businesspeople